Daniil Aleksandrovich Granin (1 January 1919 – 4 July 2017), original family name German, was a Soviet and Russian author.

Life and career
Granin started writing in the 1930s, while he was still an engineering student at the Leningrad Polytechnical Institute. After graduation, Granin began working as a senior engineer at an energy laboratory, and shortly after war broke out, he volunteered to fight as a soldier.

One of the first widely praised works of Granin was a short story about graduate students titled "Variant vtoroi" (The second variant), which was published in the journal Zvezda in 1949. Granin had continued to study engineering and work as a technical writer before he achieved literary success, thanks to his Iskateli (The Seekers, 1955), a novel inspired by his career in engineering. This book was about the overly bureaucratic Soviet system, which tended to stifle new ideas. Granin served as a board member of the Leningrad Union of Writers, and he was a winner of many medals and honors including the State Prize for Literature in 1978 and Hero of Socialist Labor 1989. He continued writing in the post-Soviet era.

Writing
According to the Great Soviet Encyclopedia: "The main theme of Granin’s works is the romance and poetry of scientific and technological creativity and the struggle between searching, principled, genuine scientists imbued with the communist ideological context and untalented people, careerists, and bureaucrats (the novels Those Who Seek, 1954, and Into the Storm, 1962)".

In 1979, he published Blokadnaya kniga (translated as A Book of the Blockade), which mainly revolves around the lives of two small children, a 16-year-old boy and an academic during the Siege of Leningrad. Written together with Ales Adamovich, the book is based on the interviews, diaries and personal memoirs of those, who survived the siege during 1941–44. It was nominated for the 2004 Lettre Ulysses Award for the Art of Reportage. On September 8, 2021, the film "The Blockade Diary," based on Granin's "A Book of the Blockade," was presented in Moscow cinemas.

One of his most popular books is The Bison (1987), which tells the story of the Soviet geneticist Nikolay Timofeev-Ressovsky. In October 1993, he signed the Letter of Forty-Two.

Honours and awards

 Hero of Socialist Labour (1989)
 Order of St. Andrew (28 December 2008) – for outstanding contribution to the development of national literature, many years of creative and social activities
 Order of Lenin
 Order of the Red Banner of Labour
 Order of the Red Star
 Order of Friendship of Peoples
 State Prize of the Russian Federation (12 June 2017)

Works
Below is a list of works by Granin translated into English:

Those Who Seek (1954)
Into the Storm (1962, tr. 1965)
 The House on the Fontanka (1967, tr. 1970)
A Book of the Blockade (1979, tr. 1983)
The Bison: A Novel about the Scientist Who Defied Stalin (1987, tr. 1990)

Notes

References

External links

1919 births
2017 deaths
People from Rylsky District
People from Rylsky Uyezd
Communist Party of the Soviet Union members
Members of the Congress of People's Deputies of the Soviet Union
Russian male novelists
Russian male short story writers
Soviet male writers
Soviet novelists
Soviet short story writers
20th-century male writers
20th-century Russian short story writers
Soviet Army officers
Peter the Great St. Petersburg Polytechnic University alumni
Academicians of the Russian Academy of Cinema Arts and Sciences "Nika"
Honorary Members of the Russian Academy of Arts
Members of the Academy of Arts, Berlin
Soviet military personnel of World War II
Recipients of the USSR State Prize
State Prize of the Russian Federation laureates
Heroes of Socialist Labour
Recipients of the Order of Lenin
Recipients of the Order of the Red Banner of Labour
Recipients of the Order of the Red Star
Recipients of the Medal of Zhukov
Recipients of the Order "For Merit to the Fatherland", 3rd class
Recipients of the Order of Friendship of Peoples
Recipients of the Order of Holy Prince Daniel of Moscow
Officers Crosses of the Order of Merit of the Federal Republic of Germany